Lonesome Luke, Mechanic is a 1917 American short comedy film featuring Harold Lloyd.

Cast
 Harold Lloyd as Lonesome Luke
 Snub Pollard
 Bebe Daniels
 Arthur Mumas
 Sammy Brooks
 W.L. Adams
 Bud Jamison
 Sidney De Gray
 Lottie Case
 May Ballard
 Gus Leonard
 Harvey L. Kinney
 Elmer Ballard
 Estelle Harrison
 Dorothea Wolbert
 Marie Mosquini

See also
 Harold Lloyd filmography

References

External links

1917 films
1917 comedy films
Silent American comedy films
American black-and-white films
1917 short films
American silent short films
Films directed by Hal Roach
Lonesome Luke films
American comedy short films
1910s American films